This is a list of live action transgender characters in television (includes TV movies and web series). The orientation can be portrayed on-screen, described in the dialogue or mentioned. Roles include lead, main, recurring, supporting, and guest.

The names are organized in alphabetical order by the surname (i.e. last name), or by a single name if the character does not have a surname. Some naming customs write the family name first followed by the given name; in these cases, the names in the list appear under the family name (e.g. the name Jung Seo-hyun [Korean] is organized alphabetically under "J").



List

See also

 List of transgender characters in film
 List of transgender-related topics
 Media portrayals of transgender people
 List of feature films with LGBT characters
 List of comedy television series with LGBT characters
 List of dramatic television series with LGBT characters: 1960s–2000s
 List of dramatic television series with LGBT characters: 2010s
 List of dramatic television series with LGBT characters: 2020s
 List of made-for-television films with LGBT characters
 List of LGBT characters in radio and podcasts
 List of soap operas with LGBT characters
 List of LGBT characters
 Lists of American television episodes with LGBT themes

Notes

References

Citations

Sources

External links 
 List of television shows with transgender themes

Lists of character lists
Lists of entertainment lists
Transgender in television
Transgender-related lists
List